The New Prescription is the ninth and final album by Breed. Released in 2004, it was Breed's final album, and the only release by UMZ Entertainment, a subsidiary of Psychopathic Records.

Conception

Background 

Breed signed to UMZ Entertainment after leaving Fharmacy Recordings. UMZ was founded by Alex Abbiss as a subsidiary of Psychopathic Records, a label founded by Abbiss and Insane Clown Posse. Abbiss wanted to release music intended for a wider audience than ICP's Juggalo fanbase. Regarding Breed, ICP member and label chairman Joseph Bruce stated, "It’s just a business relationship that turned friends. We’re not doing anything with him in the future that we know of as far as tours or anything like that. He’s just doing his thing. His record is a great record."

Recording 

Breed recorded The New Prescription with production by Psychopathic artist Esham, Psychopathic-affiliated rapper Lavel, and non-affiliated producers Ess Man and G. Piece. The album's songs were engineered, mixed, and arranged by Psychopathic producers Fritz "the Cat" Van Kosky, J. Hicks and Esham. "Gotta Go" featured vocals by singer Tobi, while "Roll" featured a guest rap verse by Esham.

Release 

"Rap Game" was released as a promo single, and a music video was produced, featuring an appearance by Tech N9ne in the video.

Track listing

Personnel 

 Breed  –  vocals, lyrics
 Tobi  –  guest vocals, lyrics
 Esham  –  guest vocals, production, mixing, engineering, arrangement 
 Lavel  – skit vocals, production
 G. Pierce  –  production
 Ess Man  –  production
 Fritz "the Cat" Van Kosky  – engineering, mixing, arrangement
 J. Hicks  – engineering, mixing, arrangement

References 

2004 albums
Albums produced by Esham
MC Breed albums
Psychopathic Records albums